Comet Hartley 2, designated as 103P/Hartley by the Minor Planet Center, is a small periodic comet with an orbital period of 6.46 years. It was discovered by Malcolm Hartley in 1986 at the Schmidt Telescope Unit, Siding Spring Observatory, Australia. Its diameter is estimated to be .

Hartley 2 was the target of a flyby of the Deep Impact spacecraft, as part of the EPOXI mission, on 4 November 2010, which was able to approach within  of Hartley 2 as part of its extended mission.  Hartley 2 is the smallest comet which has been visited. It is the fifth comet visited by spacecraft, and the second comet visited by the Deep Impact spacecraft, which first visited comet Tempel 1 on 4 July 2005.

Discovery and orbit
Comet Hartley 2 is a small Jupiter-family comet having an orbital period of 6.46 years. It was discovered by Malcolm Hartley in 1986 at the Schmidt Telescope Unit, Siding Spring Observatory, Australia. It has the perihelion near the Earth's orbit at 1.05 AU from the Sun.

2010 Earth approach

The comet passed within  of Earth on 20 October 2010, only eight days before coming to perihelion (closest approach to the Sun) on 28 October 2010. From northern latitudes, during early November 2010, the comet was visible around midnight without interference from the Moon.

2023 Earth approach

Despite its current close passage by Earth's orbit, the comet is not yet a known source of meteor showers. However, that could change. Dust trails from the recent returns of 103P/Hartley 2 move in and out of Earth's orbit, and the 1979-dust trail is expected to hit in 2062 and 2068.

Characteristics

Barring a catastrophic breakup or major splitting event, the comet should be able to survive up to another 100 apparitions (~700 years) at its current rate of mass loss.

Radar observations by the Arecibo Observatory during the comet's 2010 apparition revealed that the nucleus is highly elongated and rotates over an 18-hour period. The project manager of the EPOXI mission described its shape as "a cross between a bowling pin and a pickle".

In 2011 Herschel Space Observatory detected the signature of vaporized water in the comet's coma. Hartley 2 contains half as much heavy water as other comets analyzed before, with the same ratio between heavy water and regular water as found in Earth's oceans.

For many years, it was known that few comets produced more water vapor than it should by the redirection of nucleus of water ice. The flyby of Hartley 2 showed that many of the icy grains in the coma are driven out by the outgassing of carbon dioxide. It is believed that this is the source of much of the water coming from the comet.

Observations of Hartley 2 showed the importance of carbon-monoxide ice to carbon-dioxide ice in comets. After a reexamination, it was found that the abundances of carbon-monoxide ice and carbon dioxide ice show that short-period comets formed under warmer conditions, than the longer period comets. This shows that the short-period comets formed closer to the Sun, than the long-term comets. This discovery goes well with the measurements of Heavy Water in Hartley 2.

Deep Impact flyby (EPOXI mission) 

The EPOXI mission flyby showed that the material being ejected from the comet is primarily composed of  gas. Michael A'Hearn, the science team leader for the EPOXI mission, stated "Early observations of the comet show that, for the first time, we may be able to connect activity to individual features on the nucleus".

A University of Maryland-led study published in the 17 June issue of the journal Science described an analysis of the mission.
Moreover, these objects appear to be two to three times more reflective than the surface average.

"Hartley 2 is a hyperactive little comet, spewing out more water than other comets its size", said University of Maryland Astronomer Michael A'Hearn, who is lead author on the Science paper and principal investigator for the EPOXI and Deep Impact missions. "When warmed by the Sun, dry ice [frozen carbon dioxide] deep in the comet's body turns to gas jetting off the comet and dragging water ice with it."

It is now believed that some of the dust, icy chunks, and other material coming off the ends of the comet are moving slowly enough to be captured by even the weak gravity of the comet. This material then falls back into the lowest point—the middle.

Deep Impact flyby

The Deep Impact spacecraft, which had previously photographed Comet Tempel 1, is now being reused by NASA to study Hartley 2. The initial plan was for a flyby of Comet Boethin. However, Boethin had not been observed since 1986, and its orbit could not be calculated with sufficient precision to permit a flyby, so NASA re-targeted the spacecraft toward Hartley 2 instead. The data from the flyby were transmitted back to Earth through NASA's Deep Space Network.

Some jets of material are being ejected from the dark side of the comet, rather than the sunlit side. Scientists involved in the EPOXI mission describe the comet as being unusually active, with mission scientist Don Yeomans stating that "It's hyperactive, small and feisty."

NASA's scientists reported that the rays coming off the rough ends consist of hundreds of tons of fluffy ice and dust chunks – the largest particles are of golf ball to basketball-size – and they are ejected by jets of carbon dioxide. The scientists also said that this is the first time that comet activity powered by sublimation of frozen carbon dioxide is observed as the comet nears the sun; the  ice within the comet must be primordial, dating from the beginnings of the solar system.

See also 
 List of periodic comets
 List of minor planets and comets visited by spacecraft

References

External links 

 Orbital simulation from JPL Solar System Dynamics
 Horizons Ephemeris
 103P/Hartley 2 (2010) at Seiichi Yoshida / 103P/Hartley 2 magnitude plot for 2010
 103P/Hartley 2 page on the Cometography web site (extensive history and images)
 Cometary Science Center webpage for comet 103P
 Secular Light Curve of Comet 103P/Hartley 2, Target of the EPOXI Mission
 Amateur images, tracking and observation reports of 103P/Hartley 2 during the 2010 pass

 Finder chart and observation reports from Society for Popular Astronomy during October 2010
 

Periodic comets
103P
0103
Discoveries by Malcolm Hartley
Comets visited by spacecraft
Comets in 2017
19860315